Therapeutic target may refer to:
 Biological target, a protein or nucleic acid whose activity can be modified by an external stimulus
 Therapeutic Targets Database, a database to provide information about the known and explored therapeutic targets
 Therapeutic target range, an alternative reference range